Lock and Dam No. 26 was a lock and dam located near Alton, Illinois on the Upper Mississippi River around river mile 202.5.

Opened in 1938, its largest lock was 600 feet long.  It was demolished in 1990 and replaced by the Melvin Price Locks and Dam, which is also known as Lock and Dam number 26.

See also
Old Clark Bridge

External links
 includes photos of the lock and dam, the old Clark Bridge, and the adjacent swing span rail bridge.

Buildings and structures in Madison County, Illinois
Mississippi River locks
Buildings and structures in St. Charles County, Missouri
Dams in Missouri
Dams in Illinois
United States Army Corps of Engineers dams
Transport infrastructure completed in 1938
Historic American Engineering Record in Illinois
Historic American Engineering Record in Missouri
Transportation buildings and structures in Madison County, Illinois